The New Glarus Public School and High School building is located in New Glarus, Wisconsin.

History
The school was first constructed in the 1890s, with several addition made over the decades. Since then, it has been converted into an apartment building. It was added to the State Register of Historic Places in 1997 and to the National Register of Historic Places the following year.

References

School buildings on the National Register of Historic Places in Wisconsin
Residential buildings on the National Register of Historic Places in Wisconsin
National Register of Historic Places in Green County, Wisconsin
Public high schools in Wisconsin
Schools in Green County, Wisconsin
Defunct schools in Wisconsin
Richardsonian Romanesque architecture in Wisconsin
Art Deco architecture in Wisconsin
Brick buildings and structures
1890s establishments in Wisconsin
School buildings completed in the 19th century